Hank Parker's Outdoor Magazine is an American half-hour outdoor fishing television series hosted by former professional tournament angler Hank Parker. The show made its debut in syndication on January 18, 1985. The show was created in 1984 by founding executive producers Hank Parker and Michael Runnels; For the first 14 seasons of the show's run (1985-1998), Parker/Runnels Productions produces the show; In 1999, longtime executive producer Michael Runnels left the show, leaving Hank Parker as the sole executive producer; The company was renamed Hank Parker Productions. The show was broadcast in NTSC from 1985 to 2009 (seasons 1-24). In 2009 to celebrate the show's 25th anniversary, Hank Parker's Outdoor Magazine began broadcasting in HDTV 1080i.

Format
During each half-hour episode, Hank Parker takes viewers on a fishing journey to the great outdoors. He offers fishing tips and techniques, invites guests, and meets some of the world's famous animals to eat.

Theme music
The theme music for his show was composed by William A. Landers. It consisted of Landers singing the "do do do do do do" part, along with a harmonica and tapping drum, and ends with Landers singing "The house needs painting, grass needs mowing, where's he at?; He's gone fishing". The closing version features the same tune, and ends with Landers singing "Gone fishing".

Segments
Kid's Korner: Sponsored by Mercury Outboards, the Kid's Korner kids demonstrate their fishing tips and techniques. This segment debuted in Season 10 (1994).
Tip of the Week: Hank Parker offers viewers on giving fishing tips and techniques.
Tricks of the Trade: Hank gives the scoop on fishing tricks.

Opening and closing sequence
The original opening and closing sequence, which was used for the first 10 seasons (1985-1994), and shows Parker's daily morning routine; starting with a clock saying "5:30", turning on the light, feet hitting the floor, leaving his house with his fishing rod, getting into his Choo-Choo Customs van, Parker starting his motorboat, an exterior shot of the house, a shot of the answering machine, and a silhouette of Parker fishing, which transforms into a title card; and it opens up to reveal a still drawing of Parker himself. Starting in Season 2 (1986), it flips over to see the headline reading "PARKER'S CLASSIC VICTORY '79 B.A.S.S. Masters Classic", and in later seasons, the banner reads "'89 CHAMPION", and it flips over to see the headline reading "1983 Special Issue B.A.S.S. Angler-of-the-Year "SUPER PRO" Hank Parker", and then, it flips over to see the headline reading "PARKER COMPLETES GRAND SLAM Winner, SUPER B.A.S.S. IV April, 1985", all in Korinna font; the same font used for the answers on Jeopardy!, followed by the show's logo again. The closing credits feature Parker returning home from his fishing trip, and closes to reveal the Parker/Runnels Productions logo, with the title card next to it.

Starting in Season 11 (1995), this opening was replaced by video footage of different families fishing, as well as scenes of Parker himself, and an image of Parker winning the 1989 Bassmaster Classic is shown. At the end, we see a silhouette of Parker himself fishing, and then, the picture freezes, as the show's logo appeared onscreen. The closing version is the same as the opening.

References

External links

1985 American television series debuts
1990s American television series
2000s American television series
2010s American television series
American sports television series
English-language television shows
First-run syndicated television programs in the United States